The Montana Department of Justice is a state law enforcement agency of Montana. The Department is equivalent to the State Bureau of Investigation in other states.

The Montana Attorney General, currently Republican Austin Knudsen, heads the agency.

Responsibilities
The Attorney General serves as 1 of 5 members of the state Land Board.  The Land Board oversees the money generated from 5.2 million acres of land in the state.

The Montana Attorney General acts as the supervisor for the 56 County Attorneys in the State.

List of attorneys general since statehood

References

List of all past Attorneys General of the State of Montana

External links
 Montana Attorney General articles at ABA Journal
 News and Commentary at FindLaw
 Montana Code Annotated at Law.Justia.com
 U.S. Supreme Court Opinions - "Cases with title containing: State of Montana" at FindLaw
 State Bar of Montana
 Montana Attorney General Tim Fox profile at National Association of Attorneys General
 Press releases at Montana Department of Justice

State law enforcement agencies of Montana

State Bureaus of Investigation